Bryan Michael Pilgrim (born 3 January 1947) is a Saint Lucian politician. He served as 4th Prime Minister of Saint Lucia (Acting Prime Minister) after the resignation of Winston Cenac on 17 January 1982. As agreed he served for four months and on his party's loss in the elections he was succeeded in May 1982 by John Compton, leader of the United Workers' Party. Pilgrim was a member of the Progressive Labour Party.

See also
 United Workers Party (Saint Lucia)
 Politics of Saint Lucia
 List of prime ministers of Saint Lucia

References

 Organisation of Eastern Caribbean States

External links
Office of the Prime Minister of Saint Lucia
Biography available in Prime Ministers of Saint Lucia

Prime Ministers of Saint Lucia
Progressive Labour Party (Saint Lucia) politicians
Living people
1947 births